Sir Michael Ronald Stoute (born 22 October 1945) is a Barbadian British Thoroughbred horse trainer in flat racing.

Career
Stoute, whose father was the Chief of Police for Barbados, left the island in 1964 at the age of 19 to become an assistant to trainer Pat Rohan and began training horses on his own in 1972. His first win as a trainer came on 28 April 1972 when Sandal, a horse owned by Stoute's father, won at Newmarket Racecourse in England. Since then, he has gone on to win races all over the globe, including victories in the Dubai World Cup, the Breeders Cup, the Japan Cup and the Hong Kong Vase.

He was knighted in the 1998 Birthday Honours for promotion of sports tourism in Barbados. He was the only trainer in the 20th century to win an English Classic in five successive seasons and has been Champion Trainer ten times (1981, 1986, 1989, 1994, 1997, 2000, 2003, 2005, 2006 and 2009). He was the trainer for Kribensis, who won the Triple Crown of Hurdling, in the 1989/90 racing season.  Stoute also trained Shergar, arguably his most famous horse, who won the 1981 Epsom Derby and was later stolen, presumably by the IRA.

In 2009, three horses trained by StouteConduit, Tartan Bearer and Askpulled off a rare feat when the trio made a clean sweep of the placings at the King George VI and Queen Elizabeth Stakes. In all, the horses took home $1,787,000 of the $2,008,945 prizemoney in Britain's richest horserace. Those wins helped him regain his Champion Trainer title in 2009, winning a total of £3,372,287 in prize money.

In 2013, he trained the Queen's horse Estimate to Gold Cup victory at Royal Ascot.

Stoute currently trains horses at Freemason Lodge Stables and at Beech Hurst Stables, both on the Bury Road in Newmarket.

Major wins

 Great Britain
 1,000 Guineas – (2) – Musical Bliss (1989), Russian Rhythm (2003)
 2,000 Guineas – (5) – Shadeed (1985), Doyoun (1988), Entrepreneur (1997), King's Best (2000), Golan (2001)
 Ascot Gold Cup – (2) – Shangamuzo (1978), Estimate (2013)
 Champion Hurdle – (1) – Kribensis (1990)
 Champion Stakes – (3) – Pilsudski (1997), Kalanisi (2000), Bay Bridge (2022)
 Cheveley Park Stakes – (3) – Marwell (1980), Gay Gallanta (1994), Regal Rose (2000)
 Commonwealth Cup - (1) - Eqtidaar (2018)
 Coronation Cup – (5) – Saddlers' Hall (1992), Opera House (1993), Singspiel (1997), Daliapour (2000), Ask (2009)
 Coronation Stakes – (4) – Sonic Lady (1986), Milligram (1987), Exclusive (1998), Russian Rhythm (2003)
 Christmas Hurdle - (2) - Kribensis (1988, 1989)
 Derby – (6) – Shergar (1981), Shahrastani (1986), Kris Kin (2003), North Light (2004), Workforce (2010), Desert Crown (2022)
 Dewhurst Stakes – (1) – Ajdal (1986)
 Diamond Jubilee Stakes - (1) -  Dream of Dreams (2021) 
 Eclipse Stakes – (6) – Opera House (1993), Ezzoud (1994), Pilsudski (1997), Medicean (2001), Notnowcato (2007), Ulysses (2017)
 Falmouth Stakes – (6) – Royal Heroine (1983), Sonic Lady (1986, 1987), Lovers Knot (1998), Integral (2014), Veracious (2019)
 Fighting Fifth Hurdle - (1) -  Kribensis (1989) 
 Fillies' Mile – (2) – Untold (1985), Red Bloom (2003)
 Diamond Jubilee Stakes – (1) – Dafayna (1985)
 Haydock Sprint Cup – (3) – Green Desert (1986), Ajdal (1987), Dream of Dreams (2020)
 International Stakes – (6) – Shardari (1986), Ezzoud (1993, 1994), Singspiel (1997), Notnowcato (2006), Ulysses (2017)
 July Cup – (3) – Marwell (1981), Green Desert (1986), Ajdal (1987)
 King George VI and Queen Elizabeth Stakes – (6) – Shergar (1981), Opera House (1993), Golan (2002), Conduit (2009), Harbinger (2010), Poet's Word (2018)
 King's Stand Stakes – (1) – Marwell (1981)
 Lockinge Stakes – (8) – Scottish Reel (1986), Safawan (1990), Soviet Line (1995, 1996), Medicean (2001), Russian Rhythm (2004), Peeress (2006), Mustashry (2019)
 Nassau Stakes – (7) – Triple First (1977), Optimistic Lass (1984), Kartajana (1990), Hawajiss (1994), Islington (2002), Russian Rhythm (2003), Favourable Terms (2004)
 Nunthorpe Stakes – (2) – Blue Cashmere (1974), Ajdal (1987)
 Oaks – (2) – Fair Salinia (1978), Unite (1987)
 Prince of Wales's Stakes – (4) – Hard Fought (1981), Stagecraft (1991), Poet's Word (2018), Crystal Ocean (2019)
 Queen Anne Stakes – (3) – Kalanisi (2000), Medicean (2001), No Excuse Needed (2002)
 Queen Elizabeth II Stakes – (3) – Shadeed (1985), Milligram (1987), Zilzal (1989)
 Racing Post Trophy – (1) – Dilshaan (2000)
 St. James's Palace Stakes – (1) – Shaadi (1989)
 St. Leger Stakes – (1) – Conduit (2008)
 Sun Chariot Stakes – (4) – Triple First (1977), Kartajana (1990), Peeress (2005), Integral (2014)
 Sussex Stakes – (3) – Sonic Lady (1986), Zilzal (1989), Among Men (1998)
 Triumph Hurdle - (1) -  Kribensis (1988)
 Yorkshire Oaks – (9) – Fair Salinia (1978), Sally Brown (1985), Untold (1986), Hellenic (1990), Pure Grain (1995), Petrushka (2000), Islington (2002, 2003), Quiff (2004) Canada
 Canadian International Stakes – (3) – Singspiel (1996), Hillstar (2014), Cannock Chase (2015) E.P. Taylor Stakes – (1) – Ivor's Image (1986) France
 Grand Prix de Saint-Cloud – (3) – Gamut (2004), Mountain High (2007), Spanish Moon (2009) Prix de l'Arc de Triomphe – (1) – Workforce (2010) Prix du Moulin de Longchamp – (1) – Sonic Lady (1986) Prix de l'Opéra – (4) – Royal Heroine (1983), Bella Colora (1985), Petrushka (2000), Zee Zee Top (2003) Prix Royal-Oak – (2) – Allegretto (2007), Ask (2009) Germany
 Bayerisches Zuchtrennen – (2) – Greek Dance (2000), Linngari (2008) Grosser Preis von Baden – (1) – Pilsudski (1996) Hong Kong
 Hong Kong Bowl – (1) – Soviet Line (1994) Hong Kong Vase – (1) – Daliapour (2000) Ireland
 Irish 1,000 Guineas – (1) – Sonic Lady (1986) Irish 2,000 Guineas – (1) – Shaadi (1989) Irish Champion Stakes – (2) – Cézanne (1994), Pilsudski (1997) Irish Derby – (3) – Shergar (1981), Shareef Dancer (1983), Shahrastani (1986) Irish Oaks – (6) – Fair Salinia (1978), Colorspin (1986), Unite (1987), Melodist (1988, dead heat), Pure Grain (1995), Petrushka (2000) Matron Stakes – (2) – Favourable Terms (2003), Echelon (2007) Pretty Polly Stakes – (1) – Promising Lead (2008) Tattersalls Gold Cup – (2) – Opera House (1992), Notnowcato (2007) Italy
 Gran Criterium - (1) - Northern Tempest (1983) Oaks d'Italia – (2) – Ivor's Image (1986), Melodist (1988) Japan
 Japan Cup – (2) – Singspiel (1996), Pilsudski (1997) United Arab Emirates
 Dubai Sheema Classic – (1) – Fantastic Light (2000) Dubai World Cup – (1) – Singspiel (1997) United States
 Beverly D. Stakes - (1) - Dank (2013) Breeders' Cup Filly & Mare Turf – (3) – Islington (2003), Dank (2013), Queen's Trust (2016) Breeders' Cup Mile - (1) - Expert Eye (2018) Breeders' Cup Turf – (4) – Pilsudski (1996), Kalanisi (2000), Conduit (2008, 2009)''

References

External links
Sir Michael Stoute

British racehorse trainers
Barbadian horse trainers
1945 births
Living people
Knights Bachelor
Barbadian knights
People in sports awarded knighthoods
Barbadian emigrants to England
Barbadian people of British descent
People from Newmarket, Suffolk